Velké Kunětice is a municipality and village in Jeseník District in the Olomouc Region of the Czech Republic. It has about 500 inhabitants. It lies on the border with Poland.

History
The first written mention of Velké Kunětice is from 1284, when it was owned by the Bishopric in Wrocław. At the end of the 15th century, there were limestone quarries and iron ore was probably mined in the area.

From 1938 to 1945 it was occupied by Germany. During World War II, the Germans operated the E114 forced labour subcamp of the Stalag VIII-B/344 prisoner-of-war camp at the local stone quarry and factory.

References

External links

Villages in Jeseník District
Czech Republic–Poland border crossings
Czech Silesia